A list of the historic capitals of Kingdom of Norway.

List

See also 
 List of former national capitals in Northern Europe
 History of Norway

 
.Historical
.Historical
Norway, Historical
Norwegian, Historical
Historical capitals
Historical capitals
Norwegian, Historical